Anopheles punctipennis is a species of mosquito in genus Anopheles. It is native to North America.

The larvae of this species can be found many kinds of natural and artificial water bodies, especially cool, clear waters such as streams. Females feed on blood, including the blood of humans, and may bite during the day or night. They generally stay outdoors and are rarely found inside dwellings.This species is a vector of P. vivax, one of the protozoans that cause malaria.

References

punctipennis
Insect vectors of human pathogens
Insects described in 1823